Parachronistis jiriensis is a moth of the family Gelechiidae. It is found in Korea and the Russian Far East.

The wingspan is 10–13 mm. Adults are similar to Parachronistis maritima, but can be distinguished by the more blackish or dark grey ground colour.

References

Moths described in 1985
Parachronistis